The Eagan Transit Station is a transit facility located in Eagan, Minnesota. Riders also hail from the nearby communities of Mendota Heights and Northern Rosemount. The Park & Ride lot has 750 parking spaces for bus passengers and retail employees. 

The station is an example of mixed-use, transit-oriented development.  Originally a surface lot for a park-and-ride stop, it now includes retailers such as Cole's Salon, Starbucks, Bruegger's Bagels, The Tobacco Outlet, LeeAnn Chin and T-Mobile. The facility is owned by the city of Eagan, Dakota County Transit Offices, and the Minnesota Valley Transit Authority.

Bus connections
MVTA Bus routes:
 Route 445 (METRO Red Line - Cedar Grove Station / Blue Cross Road / Yankee Doodle Road / Eagan Town Center / Thomson Reuters)
 Route 446 (METRO Blue Line - 46th Street Station / Parkview Plaza / Mendota Heights Business Park / Corporate Center Drive / Eagandale / USPS Minnesota Hub / Wescott Rd & Denmark Ave / Duckwood Dr & Lexington Ave /  Northview Park Rd & Elrene Rd / Eagan High School)
 Route 470 (Downtown Minneapolis / Lake Street I-35W Station / Donald Rd & Yankee Doodle Rd / Blackhawk) 
 Route 480 (METRO Green Line - Saint Paul Union Depot / Blackhawk / Palomino Hills / METRO Red Line - Apple Valley Transit Station / Cliff Rd / Burnsville Parkway / Heart of the City P&R)
 Route 484 (METRO Green Line - Saint Paul Union Depot / Pilot Knob Rd / Blue Cross Road / Silver Bell Road / Rahn Road / Nichols Road)

References

External links
 Transit Stations/Park & Ride - MVTA

Bus stations in Minnesota